Josef Ackermann (26 April 1905 – 5 March 1997) was a German politician and a representative of the Reichstag for the Nazi Party (NSDAP), joining the party in 1925.  Born in Arenberg-Immendorf he died in Vallendar, Rhineland-Palatinate, Germany.

Life & career

Born the son of a coachman in Arenberg-Immendorf, Prussia, Ackermann attended primary and commercial trade school from 1911 to 1919.  After joining the Nazi party in 1925, he later became the Gauredner.

After the Nazis seized power in 1936, Ackermann became Regional Inspector in the Koblenz-Trier area under Gauleiter Gustav Simon, and in 1942 in the Mosel district.  After the occupation of Luxembourg by German troops in May 1940, Simon, in addition to Gauleiter, was named the Head of Civil Administration (CDZ) in Luxembourg.  He took Ackermann with him to be part of his staff. Ackermann was a member of the Sturmabteilung (SA), where he became SA-Oberführer on 9 November 1938 and was promoted to the rank of SA-Brigadeführer on 9 November 1943. On 9 December 1941 Ackermann became the successor in the Reichstag to Detlef Dern for the seat from Neuwied.

In the spring of 1945, Ackermann and his wife fled to an air raid shelter in Arenberg that had spots reserved for Nazi Party members.  A one-legged German soldier, who had recently been at the military hospital, became upset that Ackermann would be permitted entrance and protested.  Ackermann punched the soldier in response.  Angered by this, the shelter attendees refused entry to Ackermann and his wife.  

After the war, he was interned by the Allies and a short time later he was extradited from Luxembourg. According to documents from the Central Office of the State Justice Administration for the Investigation of National Socialist Crimes, he was sentenced to ten years hard labour on 21 July 1950, in Luxembourg.  Following a pardon on 23 April 1951 his sentence was reduced to seven years imprisonment.  Ackermann returned to Germany in the early 1950s when his prior years of internment were counted against the reduced sentence and he was released.

Further reading
 Joachim Lilla (Bearbeiter): Statisten in Uniform. Die Mitglieder des Reichstags 1933-1945. Droste Verlag, Düsseldorf 2004. .
 Michael Rademacher: Handbuch der NSDAP-Gaue 1928 - 1945 : die Amtsträger der NSDAP und ihrer Organisationen auf Gau- und Kreisebene in Deutschland und Österreich sowie in den Reichsgauen Danzig-Westpreußen, Sudetenland und Wartheland. Lingenbrink, Vechta 2000. .

References

1905 births
1997 deaths
Politicians from Koblenz
People from the Rhine Province
Nazi Party politicians
Members of the Reichstag of Nazi Germany
Sturmabteilung officers
People extradited to Germany
People extradited from Luxembourg